Fiuminata is a comune (municipality) in the Province of Macerata in the Italian region Marche, located about  southwest of Ancona and about  southwest of Macerata. The municipal seat is in the frazione of Massa.

Fiuminata borders the following municipalities: Castelraimondo, Esanatoglia, Fabriano, Matelica, Nocera Umbra, Pioraco, Sefro, Serravalle di Chienti.

Among the churches in the town are:
SS Carlo e Martino alla Forcatura di Caneggia
San Paolo di Orpiano
Santa Maria Assunta in Massa
Santa Maria della Spina a Poggio
Santa Maria di Laverino, Fiuminata
San Giovanni Battista a Castello, Fiuminata
Santuario della Beata Vergine di Valcora

References

Cities and towns in the Marche